Christianshavn (literally, "[King] Christian's Harbour") is a neighbourhood in Copenhagen, Denmark. Part of the Indre By District, it is located on several artificial islands between the islands of Zealand and Amager and separated from the rest of the city centre by the Inner Harbour. It was founded in the early 17th century by Christian IV as part of his extension of the fortifications of Copenhagen. Originally, it was laid out as an independent privileged merchant's town with inspiration from Dutch cities but it was soon incorporated into Copenhagen proper. Dominated by canals, it is the part of Copenhagen with the most nautical atmosphere.

For much of the 20th century a working-class neighbourhood, Christianshavn developed a bohemian  reputation in the 1970s and it is now a fashionable, diverse and lively part of the city with its own distinctive personality. Businessmen, students, artists, hippies and traditional families with children live side by side.

Administratively, Christianshavn has been part of Indre By since 2007, but it still has its own local council.

Geography
Christianshavn covers an area of 3.43 km2, and includes three minor islands to the north, jointly referred to as Holmen. It has a population of 10,140 and a population density of 2,960 per km2.

To the south and east Christianshavn is defined by its old ramparts. To the west Christianshavn borders on the Inner Harbour that separates it from Slotsholmen and the rest of Copenhagen's city centre.

History 

In 1612, Christian IV initiated an ambitious programme to fortify Copenhagen. During the period 1618–1623, he erected earthen embarkments with five bastions
in the marshy area between Copenhagen and the island of Amager. At the same time the idea was hatched of creating a new merchant town in the area.  In 1639 the little merchant and fortress town of Christianshavn was established. However, competition from Copenhagen soon proved too strong for the little town, and by 1674 it was incorporated into its larger neighbour.

The fortifications were further developed with six more bastions in the 1660s, and seven more bastions between 1682 and 1692.  Additional reinforcements occurred between 1779 and 1791, and again in 1810–1813.  Even though the fortifications around the Inner City were being dismantled in the late 19th century, Christianshavn's fortifications continued in use into the 20th century.  Some areas were opened up in the late 1910s-1920s, and the final areas were made public space in 1961.

The fortifications are a part of the total fortification system around the old part of Copenhagen, and are one of Denmark's best preserved fortifications from the 17th century.  Today the area around the fortifications is a park area.

Christianshavn today

Christianshavn is a lively, primarily residential area. It is quartered by the Christianshavn Canal, running north–south along its length, and Torvegade, the main thoroughfare of Christianshavn, running east–west, connecting Amager Side Copenhagen to the city centre across Knippelsbro. Where the canal and the street intersects, at the geographical centre of Christianshavn, lies the square Christianshavns Torv. Along the eastern shoreline of the island runs Christianshavns Vold which now serves as the principal greenspace of the neighbourhood.

The Lower City Side of Christianshavn, also known as Christiansbro, is the most affluent part of the neighbourhood, with several modern residential developments built on the grounds of the former Burmeister & Wain / B&W Shipyard. Several headquarters are also found in the area, including most notably the Danish headquarters of Nordea along its entire harbourfront, while its most important historic building is Christian's Church. On the other—Rampar Sidet—side of the canal, the area is dominated by historic residential buildings and institutions.

Christianshavn's Upper City Side, stretching along Strandgade from Torvegade to the Trangaven Canal, is dominated by old renovated warehousess and merchant's houses. A number of large institutions are located in the area, including the Ministry of Foreign Affairs. Cultural institutions include Danish Architecture Centre and the North Atlantic House. On the other side of the canal, Christianshavn's Upper Rampart Side is the densest and most neglected part of the neighbourhood with around half of Christianshavn's 10,000 inhabitants living in that area. It is in this area that the Church of Our Saviour and Christiania are found.

Holmen is characterized by a mixture of old military buildings and new residential developments and is the home of many creative business like advertising agencies and architectural practices as well as creative educational institutions like The Royal Danish Academy of Fine Arts, School of Architecture and National Film School of Denmark.

Freetown Christiania, a partially self-governing neighborhood which has established semi-legal status as an independent community in an area of abandoned military barracks, appears as a "city within the city". It has a considerable population and is a venue for many cultural events as well as experimental and idiosyncratic "Architecture Without Architects".

Attractions
 Church of Our Saviour
 Christian's Church
 North Atlantic House with Restaurant Noma
 Christiania
 Christianshavn Rampart
Danish Architecture Centre
 Lille Mølle
 Copenhagen Opera House
 Nyholm
 Arsenal Island

Transport
Christianshavn metro station is located at Christianshavns Torv at the intersection of Christianshavn Canal and Torvegade. The station serves both the M1 and M2 lines of the Copenhagen Metro.

The 901 & 902 lines of the Copenhagen Harbour Buses have a stop at Christianshavn at the end of Knippelsbro.

Christianshavn in culture
 In Søren Kierkegaard's philosophical work Stages on Life's Way (1845), his pseudonymous alter ego Hilarius Bookbinder states that in Christianshavn "one is far, very far away from Copenhagen" and therefore Langebro (Long Bridge) deserves its name (Stages on Life's Way p. 259).
The Church of Our Saviour in Christianshavn appears in a chapter of Jules Verne's A Journey to the Center of the Earth. The character Axel is made to climb the winding spire for five consecutive days by his uncle to cure him of his Acrophobia before their descent into the volcano.
 In the 1973 film Tony Arzenta, a car hunt takes Alain Delon though Christianshavn, including Torvegade and the street along the canal.
Christianshavn has been immortalised in the then extrely popular Danish 1970s television series "Huset på Christianshavn" (English: The House on Christianshavn), one of Danish television's most popular shows ever.
 The action of Peter Høeg's novel Miss Smilla's Feeling for Snow sets off in the public housing projects 'Det Hvide Snit' (English: The White Cut, popular Danish for leukotomy) in Christianshavn.
 Christianshavns Kanal, named for the canal, is the last track on Danish singer-songwriter Kim Larsen's 1973 debut album Værsgo.
 Tom Waits wrote one of his signature songs "Tom Traubert's Blues (Four Sheets to the Wind in Copenhagen)" commonly known as "Tom Traubert's Blues" or "Waltzing Matilda") after visiting Christianshavn with Danish singer and violinist Mathilde Bondo.

Notable people
Carl Christian Hall (1812–1888) Danish statesman.
Martin Andersen Nexø, (1869–1954) Danish writer
Halfdan Rasmussen, (1915–2002) Danish poet
Link Wray, (1929–2005) guitarist
Frank Arnesen, (born 1956) Danish-footballer and sporting director
Lukas Forchhammer, (born 1988) Danish-Irish singer, songwriter

See also

 
 Holmen
 Freetown Christiania
 Radical chic

References

 
Copenhagen city districts
Artificial islands of Denmark
Populated places established in 1639